For the Welsh footballer see Linden Jones.

Lyndon Owain Jones (born 8 November 1976) is a Welsh cricketer.  Jones is a right-handed batsman who bowls right-arm off break.  He was born at Newport, Monmouthshire.

Jones made his Minor Counties Championship debut for Wales Minor Counties in 1997 against Wiltshire.  From 1997 to 2003, he represented the team in 26 Championship matches, the last of which came against Devon.  His MCCA Knockout Trophy debut for the team came in 1999 against the Warwickshire Cricket Board. From 1999 to 2003 he represented the team in 10 Trophy matches, the last of which came against Hertfordshire.  His debut List A appearance for the team came in the 2nd round of the 2000 NatWest Trophy against the Oxfordshire.  From 1999 to 2002, he represented the team in 5 List A matches, the last of which came against Cornwall in the 2nd round of the 2003 Cheltenham & Gloucester Trophy which was held in 2002.  In his 5 matches, he scored 51 runs at a batting average of 12.75, with a high score of 38.  With the ball he took 7 wickets at a bowling average of 23.57, with best figures of 2/11.

He previously played Second XI cricket for the Glamorgan Second XI and Northamptonshire Second XI.

References

External links
Lyndon Jones at Cricinfo
Lyndon Jones at CricketArchive

1976 births
Living people
Sportspeople from Newport, Wales
Welsh cricketers
Wales National County cricketers